Rani Durgavati Medical College Banda formerly known as Government Allopathic Medical College, Banda is a state medical college located in Banda, Uttar Pradesh, India.

See also
King George's Medical University (KGMU), Lucknow
Dr. Ram Manohar Lohia Institute of Medical Sciences

GSVM Medical College, Kanpur

Autonomous State Medical College, Basti

References

Medical colleges in Uttar Pradesh
Universities and colleges in Banda district, India
Banda, Uttar Pradesh